Karaahmetli is a Turkish place name and may refer to the following places in Turkey:

 Karaahmetli, Erdemli, a village in Erdemli district of Mersin Province
 Karaahmetli, Eşme, a village in Eşme district of Uşak Province
 Karaahmetli, Tirebolu, a village in Tirebolu district of Giresun Province
 Karaahmetli, Yüreğir, a village in Yüreğir district of Adana Province

Turkish toponyms